Robert Beckel could refer to: 

Robert D. Beckel (born 1937), United States Air Force general
Bob Beckel (born 1948), American political analyst